Miss Russia 2016, was the 24th Miss Russia pageant, it was held in the concert hall Barvikha Luxury Village in Moscow on 16 April 2016. Fifty contestants from around Russia competed for the crown.  Sofia Nikitchuk of Yekaterinburg crowned her successor, Yana Dobrovolskaya of Tyumen at the end of the event. The winner will represent Russia in Miss World 2016 while the 1st Runner-Up will compete in Miss Universe 2016 pageants.

Results

Placements

Contestants

Judges 
 Igor Chapurin – Fashion designer 
 Oxana Fedorova – Miss Russia 2001 and Miss Universe 2002
 Arkady Novikov – Restaurateur 
 Ksenia Sukhinova – Miss Russia 2007 and Miss World 2008
 Lyasan Utiasheva – Television presenter and former rhythmic gymnast

References

External links

Miss Russia
2016 beauty pageants
2016 in Russia